A list of notable Serbian actors and actors of Serbian descent:



A 

 Milka Grgurova-Aleksić
 Mija Aleksić
 Sasha Alexander
 Slobodan Aligrudić
 Stole Aranđelović
 Neda Arnerić
 Tihomir Arsić
 Michel Auclair
 Coco Austin

B 

 Aleksa Bačvanski
 Radoš Bajić
 Nebojša Bakočević
 Ljubomir Bandović
 Petar Banićević
 Mira Banjac
 María Baxa
 Zoran Bečić
 Troian Bellisario
 Aleksandar Berček
 Severin Bijelić
 Miloš Biković
 Predrag Bjelac
 Dragan Bjelogrlić
 Ljiljana Blagojević
 Ljubinka Bobić
 Dragomir Bojanić
 Svetlana Bojković
 Ivan Bosiljčić
 Tanja Bošković
 Petar Božović
 Vojislav Brajović
 Branimir Brstina
 Timothy John Byford

C 

 Miloš Cvetić
 Branko Cvejić
 Zoran Cvijanović
 Svetozar Cvetković

Č 

 Vesna Čipčić
 Dragomir Čumić
 Vera Čukić

Ć 

 Vojin Ćetković
 Ljubomir Ćipranić

D 
 Pera Dobrinović
 Lolita Davidovich
 Brad Dexter
 Bogdan Diklić
 Divine
 Anica Dobra
 Mike Dopud
 Tamara Dragičević
 Milena Dravić
 Radivoje Dinulovic

Đ 
 Jasna Đuričić
 Uroš Đurić
 Nikola Đuričko
 Tomanija Đuričko

E 
 Predrag Ejdus
 Vanja Ejdus

F 
 Rahela Ferari

G 
 Igor Galo
 Mirjana Gardinovački
 Nebojša Glogovac
 Svetislav Goncić
 Milena Govich
 Angela Gregovic
 Milan Gutović

I

Branislava Ilić
Boris Isaković

J 

 Toša Jovanović
 Adrienne Janic
 Dušan Janićijević
 Danina Jeftić
 Nenad Jezdić
 Mirjana Joković
 Dragan Jovanović
 Dubravko Jovanović
 Ljiljana Jovanović
 Toša Jovanović
 Milla Jovovich
 Maria Jelenska

K 

 Emanuel Kozačinski
 Bata Kameni
 Branka Katić
 Stana Katić
 Stefan Kapičić
 Marija Karan
 Mirjana Karanović
 Mima Karadžić
 Gordan Kičić
 Nikola Kojo
 Uglješa Kojadinović
 Sonja Kolačarić
 Boris Komnenić
 Vuk Kostić
 Petar Kralj
 Ljiljana Krstić
 Miodrag Krivokapić

L 

 Slavko Labović
 Predrag Laković
 Žarko Laušević
 Danilo Lazović
 Branislav Lečić
 Miroljub Lešo
 Dragoljub Ljubičić
 Beba Lončar

M 

 John Malkovich
 Marinko Madžgalj
 Dragan Maksimović
 Karl Malden
 Milorad Mandić
 Suzana Mančić
 Maja Mandžuka
 Miki Manojlović
 Dragan Marinković
 Margaret Markov
 Olivera Marković
 Rade Marković
 Irfan Mensur
 Sloboda Mićalović
 Dragan Mićanović
 Dubravka Mijatović
 Radoslav Milenković
 Živojin Milenković
 Predrag Miletić
 Branko Milićević
 Predrag Milinković
 Boris Milivojević
 John Miljan
 Milos Milos
 Vladislava Milosavljević
 Andrija Milošević
 Dobrica Milutinović
 Voja Mirić
 Gojko Mitić
 Vjera Mujović

N 

 Taško Načić
 Alex Nesic
 Dragan Nikolić
 Filip Nikolic
 Marko Nikolić
 Snežana Nikšić
 Nataša Ninković
 Slobodan Ninković
 Natalia Nogulich
 Bojana Novakovic
 Vela Nigrin

O 

 Olga Odanović
 Bojana Ordinačev
 Ljubica Otašević
 Catherine Oxenberg

P 
 Bata Paskaljević
 Nikola Pejaković
 Ljuma Penov
 Zlata Petković
 Suzana Petričević
 Iván Petrovich
 Miodrag Petrović Čkalja
 Natasha Petrovic
 Branko Pleša
 Gorica Popović
 Branka Pujić
 Milorad Petrović

R 

 Goran Radaković
 Aleksandar Radenkovic
 Katarina Radivojević
 Zoran Radmilović
 Zoran Rankić
 Eva Ras
 Ivan Rassimov
 Rada Rassimov
 Nadja Regin
 Lazar Ristovski
 Đoko Rosić
 Draginja Ružić

S 

 Seka Sablić
 Ljubiša Samardžić
 Sonja Savić
 Radmila Savićević
 Nikola Simić
 Ana Sofrenović
 Ružica Sokić
 Neda Spasojević
 Olga Spiridonović
 Ilija Stanojević (1859-1930)
 Jelica Sretenović
 Tihomir Stanić
 Boro Stjepanović
 Vlastimir Đuza Stojiljković
 Stoya
 Danilo Stojković
 Žanka Stokić
 Mira Stupica

Š 

 Stevan Šalajić
 Rade Šerbedžija
 Nataša Šolak
 Slavko Štimac

T 

 Ljuba Tadić
 Predrag Tasovac
 Josif Tatić
 Miloš Timotijević
 Jelena Tinska
 Zelda Tinska
 Bora Todorović
 Marko Todorović
 Srđan Todorović
 Milivoje Tomić
 Branko Tomović
 Branislav Trifunović
 Sergej Trifunović
 Vesna Trivalić
 Lazar Telecki

U 
 Renata Ulmanski
 Nevenka Urbanova

V 

 Branka Veselinović
 Holly Valance
 Mirka Vasiljević
 Mlađa Veselinović
 Andrijana Videnović
 Gala Videnović
 Steve Vinovich
 John Vivyan
 Janez Vrhovec
 Olivera Vučo
 Pavle Vuisić

 Lidija Vukićević

Y 
 Ursula Yovich

Z 
 Milenko Zablaćanski
 Geraldine Zivic

Ž 

 Dušica Žegarac
 Stevo Žigon
 Milivoje Živanović
 Radmila Živković
 Vladan Živković
 Bata Živojinović
 Miloš Žutić
 Katarina Žutić

See also 
 Žanka Stokić award
 History of Serbian Theatre

 
Actor
Serbian